Moncure, founded in 1881, is a small rural unincorporated community in southeastern Chatham County, North Carolina, United States. Moncure and the neighboring community of Haywood form the Moncure census-designated place (CDP), which had a population of 711 at the 2010 census. The community is located near the confluence of the Deep and Haw rivers, which form the Cape Fear River. Moncure once served as the westernmost inland port in the state, linked to the Atlantic Ocean by steamships.

Geography
It is bordered on the south by the Deep River, which forms the boundary with Lee County to the south. The Moncure CDP includes the village of Moncure, plus the smaller community of Haywood to the east; both are located along Old US Highway 1. The CDP extends as far east as the Haw River and as far south as the junction of the Haw with the Deep River to form the Cape Fear River. U.S. Route 1, a four-lane expressway, passes through Moncure north of the village center, with access from Exit 79. US 1 leads northeast  to Raleigh, the state capital, and southwest  to Sanford. The area forms a salient or panhandle of Chatham County, lying between Wake and Lee Counties.

The B. Everett Jordan Lake Dam is located just north of Moncure, and the area is home to much of Chatham County's heavy industry, including Shearon Harris Nuclear Power Plant  to the east, and several plywood and lumber plants.

Demographics

Institutions
Moncure is home to a post office (ZIP code 27559), two convenience stores and an ABC store. The Moncure Volunteer Fire Department provides fire protection for the area. The department was founded May 4, 1966. There are two stations: Station 8 in Moncure at 2389 Old US 1 and Station 14 on Corinth Road at the intersection of Highway 42. The Moncure Fire Department Ladies auxiliary is the only active auxiliary in Chatham County.

Moncure and the nearby town of Pittsboro have an active artistic community. The defunct Moncure Museum of Modern Art is located within Moncure.

History
Moncure was founded in 1881 by Thomas Jefferson Moncure, Benjamin Gunter Womble (February 17, 1841 – February 15, 1916), Jake Wisseler, and James Everett Bryan. Thomas Moncure was an engineer for what became the Seaboard Air Line Railroad. Benjamin Womble was a Confederate veteran, owner of the Womble Hotel, and first postmaster of Moncure for 30 years. The old post office now resides on the Womble property that has been continuously owned by his family.

The Newkirk State (Site 3lCH366) and Lockville Dam, Canal and Powerhouse are listed on the National Register of Historic Places.

References

Census-designated places in Chatham County, North Carolina
Census-designated places in North Carolina
Populated places on the Cape Fear River